The Altsevo peat railway is located in Nizhny Novgorod Oblast, Russia.

Current status 
The Altsevo peat railway was constructed in 1962 in the Tonshayevsky District, and runs from the village of Pizhma to the swamp "Altsovsky Moss". The railway was built for hauling peat and workers and operates year-round with several pairs of trains a day. A peat briquette factory was built and put into operation in 2005.

Rolling stock

Locomotives 
TU6A - No. 0310
TU8 - No.***
ESU2A - No. 671
TD-5U "Pioneer" - Transportation local residents

Railroad car
Flat wagon
Tank wagon
Snowplow
Crane (rail)
Tank wagon - fire train
Passenger car (rail)
Track laying cranes
Open wagon for peat
Hopper wagon to transport track ballast

Gallery

See also
Narrow-gauge railways in Russia
Kerzhenets peat narrow-gauge railway
Narrow-gauge railway of Decor-1 factory

References and sources

External links

 interactive map (English language)
 Photo - project «Steam Engine» (Russian language)
 «The site of the railroad» S. Bolashenko (Russian language)

750 mm gauge railways in Russia
Rail transport in Nizhny Novgorod Oblast